
Gmina Piwniczna-Zdrój is an urban-rural gmina (administrative district) in Nowy Sącz County, Lesser Poland Voivodeship, in southern Poland, on the Slovak border.

Villages
Apart from the town of Piwniczna-Zdrój, Gmina Piwniczna-Zdrój contains the villages and settlements of Głębokie, Kokuszka, Łomnica-Zdrój, Młodów, Wierchomla Mała, Wierchomla Wielka and Zubrzyk.

Neighbouring gminas
Gmina Piwniczna-Zdrój is bordered by the town of Szczawnica and by the gminas of Łabowa, Muszyna, Nawojowa and Rytro. It also borders Slovakia.

References
Polish official population figures 2006

Piwniczna-Zdroj
Gmina Piwniczna Zdroj